All-dressed is a potato chip flavour popular in Canada. Ruffles, a major producer of all-dressed potato chips, describes the flavour as a mix of ketchup, barbecue sauce and salt & vinegar.

History 
It is unknown who or which company first introduced the all-dressed potato chip flavour. Yum Yum, a Québec-based company, is known to have created a variety of the flavour in 1978.

An all-dressed chip called The Whole Shabang is produced by American prison supplier Keefe Group. It became available to the general public in 2016. Frito-Lay began selling all-dressed Ruffles potato chips in the United States the same year.

In 2019, Syracuse, New York potato chip maker Terrell's began selling all-dressed chips under the name "Syracuse style".

Kwik Trip convenience stores sell an All Dressed flavor of chips under their Urge store brand.

Hy-Vee stores sell an All Dressed flavour of chips under the Drive Time store brand.

References

Canadian cuisine
Convenience foods
Potato dishes
Snack foods